Souter is a Scottish surname derived from the Scots language term for a shoemaker, and may refer to:

 A nickname for any native inhabitant of the Royal Burgh of Selkirk, in the Scottish Borders
 Alexander Souter (1873–1949), Scottish biblical scholar
 Brian Souter (born 1954), Scottish businessman
 Camille Souter (1929–2023), Irish painter
 David Souter (born 1939), former Associate Justice of the Supreme Court of the United States
 David Henry Souter (1862–1935), Australian artist and journalist
 John Bulloch Souter (1890–1972), a Scottish painter and sculptor
 Tom Souter (1921–?), Scottish footballer

See also
 Souter Lighthouse
 Soutar
 Suter

Scottish surnames
Surnames of Lowland Scottish origin
Occupational surnames